Brian Hanlon is a classically trained master sculptor and founder of Hanlon Sculpture Studio. He has created over 400 public and private art pieces since 1987. Hanlon is a nationally acclaimed artist from Toms River, New Jersey, specializing in commissioned larger-than-life-size, to-scale bronze sculptures, reliefs, trophies, plaques and awards.  He is known for developing a distinguishable style of movement in contemporary American realism sculpture.

In 2015, Hanlon was named the Official Sculptor of the Naismith Memorial Basketball Hall of Fame, and in 2018 Hanlon was named the Official Sculptor of the Rose Bowl Stadium.

Hanlon has received national and local awards and commendations for his commissions, which primarily encompass the civic, historic and athletic sectors.

On January 16, 2018, Hanlon was named the "Sports Rodin," a reference to French sculptor Auguste Rodin, in the feature story "Sports Rodin Works in Bronze" by The New York Times.  In 2018, the Smithsonian American Art Museum began including Hanlon's monuments in its catalogue of contemporary American sculptors. He has been the subject of several news features, as well as a short documentary about his work that was created by Brad Nau and shown on Comcast SportsNet.

2017 was the "busiest year" in Hanlon's decades-long professional career.  Hanlon oversaw the unveiling of 30 new monuments, including Charles Barkley at Auburn, Evander Holyfield in Atlanta, Jackie Robinson as a football player at the Rose Bowl, and 12 Hoosier Icons in the lobby of Simon Skjodt Assembly Hall.

In July 2021, Gabe Albornoz, Montgomery County Council Vice President, announced that Hanlon would be sculpting a new piece in honor of Olympic gymnastic legend, Dominique Dawes.

Hanlon uses water-based clay rather than oil-based clay because he finds it to be "firmer and less pliable," which enables him to convey movement or action in his sculptures.  His commissions typically take six to 36 months to complete, based on size and scope.

Notable sculpture projects 
Elizabeth Freeman for Sheffield, Massachusetts
Women's World Cup 1999 for the Rose Bowl Stadium
Susan B. Anthony for the Adams Suffrage Centennial Committee
Harriet Tubman for the Equal Rights Cultural Heritage Center
Jody Conradt for The University of Texas
Tony Robichaux for the University of Louisiana
Jerry Coleman for the San Diego Padres
Naismith Coaches Circle for the Basketball Hall of Fame
"Coaches of the Year" Werner Ladder Naismith Trophy for the Basketball Hall of Fame
Chuck Bednarik for the University of Pennsylvania
 Steve Gleason "Rebirth" for the New Orleans Saints
 Yogi Berra for the Yogi Berra Museum and Learning Center
 Shaquille O’Neal for Louisiana State University
 Bob Cousy for the College of the Holy Cross 
 Michael Horrocks for West Chester University
 Leavander Johnson for Atlantic City, NJ
 Fr. Pedro Arrupe, S.J. 
 Pope John Paul II
 Fannie Lou Hamer for Ruleville, MS
 2nd Lt. Carol Ann Drazba, R.N. for Scranton, PA 
 George Rogers for Liberty University
 "Teamwork" Public Safety for Westminster, CO 
 Fallen Officers Memorial for Perth Amboy, NJ
 100th Fire Department Anniversary for Bridgeville, DE  
 W-6 Firefighter Memorial for Worcester, MA
 Bearcat for Binghamton University 
 Golden Eagle in Flight for Clarion University 
 Panther for Florida International University 
 Hawk for Monmouth University
Statue of Evander Holyfield for Atlanta

Education 
Hanlon took graduate level courses towards a Master of Sculpture degree at Boston University from 1988 to 1990 and left school early to work as a sculptor full-time. Prior to attending Boston University, Hanlon completed a Bachelor of Arts in Art Education at Monmouth University in 1988. While at Monmouth, he was a student-athlete and captain of the men's cross country team. Before enrolling at Monmouth, he attended Brookdale Community College and Kean University and then worked in New York City as an ironworker and teamster before re-enrolling in Brookdale.

Personal life 
Hanlon is married to the former Michele Adamkowski, a soccer stand-out at Monmouth University, and together the couple has five children. Michele was the model and subject of one of Hanlon's first sculptures when he created his "Involved Student" for Monmouth's campus in 1988 that featured her lying on the ground with a soccer ball and gym bag while reading a text book.

References

External links 
 includes a 'sculpture finder' for North America

American sculptors
Living people
Brookdale Community College alumni
Brown University alumni
Kean University alumni
Monmouth University alumni
People from Toms River, New Jersey
Year of birth missing (living people)